This is a list of all Jigoku Sensei Nūbē episodes that have aired in Japan. From episodes 30–47, the second ending theme is Spirit by Pamelah. For episode 48, the third ending theme is Baribari Saikyou No. 1.

Episode list

References

Episodes
Jigoku Sensei Nube